National Finals Rodeo is the title of numerous championship rodeo events held in Australia.

Australian Professional Rodeo Association
The largest and oldest event is run by the Australian Professional Rodeo Association, held each year in January over 4 days at the Gold Coast Convention and Exhibition Centre in Broadbeach, Queensland. The APRA event was first held in 1960 as the first in Australian rodeo history.

Australian Bushmen's Capmdraft & Rodeo Association
ABCRA's event is held at the Australian Equine and Livestock Events Centre in Tamworth, New South Wales during the Tamworth Country Music Festival.

National Rodeo Association
NRA's event is held over three Saturdays in late November and early December with events held at Ipswich, Caboolture and the Sunshine Coast in Queensland.

National Rodeo Council of Australia
NRCA's event is held in November in Dalby, Queensland over two nights in conjunction with a 3-day Professional Colt Starting Challenge.

References

External links

Rodeo in Australia
Equestrian sports competitions in Australia
Sports competitions on the Gold Coast, Queensland
Sport in the Sunshine Coast, Queensland